Henry Addington (1757–1844) was Prime Minister of the United Kingdom from 1801 to 1804.

Henry Addington may also refer to:
 Henry Unwin Addington (1790–1870), his nephew; British diplomat and civil servant
 , a list of ships with the name
, the first of two East Indiamen
, the second of two East Indiamen

See also
 Henry Addington Bruce (1874–1959),  H. Addington Bruce, American journalist and author